The 2011 Mississippi Valley State Delta Devils football team represented Mississippi Valley State University in the 2011 NCAA Division I FCS football season. The Delta Devils were led by second year head coach Karl Morgan and played their home games at Rice–Totten Field. They are a member of the East Division of the Southwestern Athletic Conference. They finished the season 1–10, 1–8 in SWAC play to finish in last place of the East Division.

Schedule

References

Mississippi Valley State
Mississippi Valley State Delta Devils football seasons
Mississippi Valley State Delta Devils football